The Los Angeles County Chief Executive Office (LAC CEO), known as the Los Angeles County Chief Administrative Office (LAC CAO) from 1938 to 2007, assists the Board of Supervisors of Los Angeles County, California with administrating the county.

CEO 2007 - 2015 
The chief executive officer (CEO) supervised 31 out of the 39 departments of the county, and worked closely with the remaining eight (which include the District Attorney, Fire Department and Sheriff's Department, among others). The CEO monitored departmental spending and makes annual recommendations on departmental budgets as well as ensuring that the policies and priorities of the Board are adhered to in its various departments. The CEO oversaw five deputy chief executive officers and two assistant chief executive officers.

Critics of this structure complained about the added layer of bureaucracy with the CEO's office and the creation of deputy chief executive officers who were responsible for coordinating activities within their "cluster" (group of related departments) but were not perceived to add any value. In 2015, the Board voted to revert to the structure prior to 2007.

CAO 1938-2007 and CEO 2015-present 

Prior to centralization (similar to a council-manager government prevalent in most of the cities in Los Angeles County) and after reversion to the previous structure, the CEO (CAO prior to 2007) provides Countywide coordination and strategic guidance. Departments report directly to the Board of Supervisors and their deputies and are hired and fired directly by the Board, with the CEO providing administrative support in negotiating department head salaries and facilitating communications between departments when necessary.

Other tasks specifically given to the CEO include preparation and control of the annual budget in consultation with departments, providing leadership and direction for Board-sponsored initiatives and priorities, analysis and advocacy of state and federal legislation; coordinating Countywide strategic communications and cross-departmental public information (including the main County website), and managing capital projects and debt, asset, leasing and space management. The CEO's office also administers the risk management and insurance programs, and facilitates departments addressing unincorporated area issues and international protocol issues, manages the County's employee relations program and compensation/classification systems, represents the Board in labor negotiations, and monitors cable television companies operating in unincorporated areas. The Chief Information Officer, Homeless Initiative (which manages Measure H, the voter-approved homeless tax), child care, and Office of Emergency Management are also located in the CEO's office.

Chief Administrative/Executive Officer

https://ceo.lacounty.gov/list-of-officers/

References

External links

Official website

Government of Los Angeles County, California
Local government in California